KESU-LP, VHF analog channel 6, was a low-powered television station licensed to Kauai, Hawaii, United States. Inspired by KZND-LP in Anchorage, Alaska, former TV weatherman Jeff Chang began his own low-power station on the Hawaiian island of Kauai. Taking advantage of the station's audio signal broadcasting on 87.75 MHz, the station marketed itself as a radio station and aired a mixture of Hawaiian music and lite AC music. KESU-LP was among the earliest channel 6 radio stations in the United States. This was possible due to a loophole in FCC regulations:
 
Sec.  73.653   Operation of TV aural and visual transmitters.

   The aural and visual transmitters may be operated independently of each
   other or, if operated simultaneously, may be used with different and
   unrelated program material.

This means that KESU-LP needed not broadcast any particular image, as long as they broadcast a video signal. The video signal that they did broadcast showed information about the island of Kauai and various public service announcements. Along with the Hawaiian music and Lite AC format, it also aired the Dickie Chang Wala'au show.

The station was able to be seen in its entirety on a traditional VHF antenna.

History

The station was founded on October 7, 2003 as K06NC and changed its call sign to KESU-LP on March 11, 2008.

The station's license was cancelled by the Federal Communications Commission on September 4, 2013.

See also
 KOAN-LP (another LPTV station branding as an FM station)

External links
Star Bulletin, January 13, 2004 (start-up of station)

ESU-LP
Television channels and stations established in 2003
2003 establishments in Hawaii
Defunct television stations in the United States
Television channels and stations disestablished in 2013
2013 disestablishments in Hawaii
ESU-LP